The 2022–23 season is the 116th season in the history of Atlético Madrid and their 21st consecutive season in the top flight. The club are participating in La Liga, the Copa del Rey, and the UEFA Champions League.

Kits

Players

Other players under contract

Reserve team

Out on loan

Transfers

In

Out

Pre-season and friendlies

Competitions

Overall record

La Liga

League table

Results summary

Results by round

Matches 
The league fixtures were announced on 23 June 2022.

Copa del Rey

UEFA Champions League

Group stage

The draw for the group stage was held on 25 August 2022.

Statistics

Squad statistics
As of match played 18 March 2023

|-
! colspan="14" style="background:#dcdcdc; text-align:center"|Goalkeepers

|-
! colspan="14" style="background:#dcdcdc; text-align:center"|Defenders

|-
! colspan="14" style="background:#dcdcdc; text-align:center"|Midfielders

|-
! colspan="14" style="background:#dcdcdc; text-align:center"|Forwards

|-
! colspan=14 style=background:#dcdcdc; text-align:center|Players who have made an appearance this season but have left the club

|}

Goalscorers

1Player left the club during the season.

References

Atlético Madrid seasons
Atlético Madrid
Atlético Madrid